José Joaquín Matos García (born 6 May 1995) is a Spanish footballer who plays for Burgos CF as a left back.

Club career
Born in Utrera, Seville, Andalusia, Matos was a Sevilla FC youth graduate. On 17 March 2013, aged only 17, he made his senior debut for the reserves by coming on as a late substitute in a 0–2 Segunda División B away loss against La Roda CF.

Despite being used sparingly, Matos was definitely promoted to the B-team only in the 2014–15 campaign. An undisputed starter, he appeared in 36 matches (all starts) as his side narrowly avoided relegation.

On 1 May 2016, Matos made his first team – and La Liga – debut, starting in a 0–1 loss at RCD Espanyol. He scored his first professional goal with the B's on 7 January 2018, in a 3–2 home defeat of Lorca FC in the Segunda División.

On 4 July 2018, free agent Matos signed a three-year contract with Cádiz CF in the second division. Roughly one year later, he extended his contract until 2022 and was loaned to Eredivisie side FC Twente for one year.

Matos returned to his parent club after having played only two league matches for Twente, and moved to Málaga CF on 16 September 2020, also in a temporary one-year deal. Upon returning, he terminated his contract with Cádiz on 15 July 2021, and signed for Burgos CF late in the month.

References

External links

1995 births
Living people
People from Utrera
Sportspeople from the Province of Seville
Spanish footballers
Footballers from Andalusia
Association football defenders
La Liga players
Segunda División players
Segunda División B players
Sevilla Atlético players
Sevilla FC players
Cádiz CF players
Málaga CF players
Burgos CF footballers
Eredivisie players
FC Twente players
Spanish expatriate footballers
Spanish expatriate sportspeople in the Netherlands
Expatriate footballers in the Netherlands